In enzymology, a coniferin beta-glucosidase is an enzyme that catalyzes the chemical reaction

coniferin + H2O  D-glucose + coniferol

Thus, the two substrates of this enzyme are coniferin and H2O, whereas its two products are D-glucose and coniferol.

This enzyme belongs to the family of hydrolases, specifically those glycosidases that hydrolyse O- and S-glycosyl compounds.  The systematic name of this enzyme class is coniferin beta-D-glucosidase. This enzyme is also called coniferin-hydrolyzing beta-glucosidase.  This enzyme participates in phenylpropanoid biosynthesis.

References 

 
 

EC 3.2.1
Enzymes of unknown structure
Phenylpropanoids metabolism